Springvale is a rural locality in the Western Downs Region, Queensland, Australia. In the  Springvale had a population of 74 people.

History 
Springvale State School opened on 13 April 1954 and closed on 1965.

In the  Springvale had a population of 74 people.

Community groups 
The Springvale Kupunn branch of the Queensland Country Women's Association meets at 52 Cunningham Street, Dalby.

References 

Western Downs Region
Localities in Queensland